QWERTY is a keyboard layout.

QWERTY may also refer to:

Arts, entertainment, and media
Qwerty, a character in the Marvel Comics including Morlocks characters
Qwerty, a computer in the children's film series VeggieTales
Dashiell Qwerty, a character in Lemony Snicket's All The Wrong Questions series

Other uses
 Qwerty Films, a British film production company
 "QWERTY Tummy", an ailment
Switching barriers, also known as the QWERTY effect
 QWERTY, a song by Linkin Park, released for their fan club exclusive LP Underground 6.0 EP.
 Qwerty, a song by Mushroomhead from the 2014 album The Righteous & the Butterfly

See also
Kuerti